CIHM can refer to:
Canadian Institute for Historical Microreproductions, now known as Canadiana.org
College of International Hospitality Management (now the College of International Tourism Hospitality Management), part of Lyceum of the Philippines University